Ablabius (Greek ), or Ablavius, was the name of several different people in the ancient world.

 Ablabius Illustrius, mentioned in the Greek Anthology
 Ablabius (consul), Praetorian prefect of the East of Constantine I, from 329 to 337/338
 Ablabius (historian) (floruit 4th/5th century), writer of a history of the Goths based on Gothic legends and sources, which was used by Cassiodorus and Jordanes
 Ablabius (assassin), a man who attempted to kill Justinian I in 562

Masculine given names